This is a list of the National Register of Historic Places listings in Somerset County, Pennsylvania.

This is intended to be a complete list of the properties and districts on National Register of Historic Places in Somerset County, Pennsylvania. The locations of National Register properties and districts for which the latitude and longitude coordinates are included below, may be seen in a map.

There are 32 properties and districts listed on the National Register in the county.  One site is designated as a National Historic Site.

Current listings

|}

See also

 List of Pennsylvania state historical markers in Somerset County

References

.
Somerset County